Cornwall Lake 224 is an Indian reserve of the Mikisew Cree First Nation in Alberta, located within the Regional Municipality of Wood Buffalo.

References

Regional Municipality of Wood Buffalo
Indian reserves in Alberta